La Niñera is a Mexican sitcom based on The Nanny. It stars Lissete who plays Fran Flores, a charming and friendly resident from Roma. She accidentally becomes the nanny of three upper-class children in Mexico. The opening theme song is sung by the main character, Lissete.

Plot 
The story revolves around Fran Flores, who is fired from her job as a bridal consultant in her boyfriend's store. After working in the cosmetics line "Elba Esther," ends up as a nanny for theater producer Maximiliano Fabregas. After that, she experiences many adventures with his children, Maximiliano's assistant, Sisi, (who is in love with him), and Nicholas the Butler.

Cast 
Lisset as Fran
Francisco De La O as Maximiliano
Roberto Leyva as Nicolas
Luciana Silveyra as Sisi
Daniela Wong as Julieta
Carlos Hays as Fausto
Gala Montes as Elenita
Emma Parga as Teresa
Marta Verduzco as Grandmother Tete

Guest appearances 
 Victor Garcia
Lupita Sandoval
Regina Torne
Amaranta Ruiz
 Sergio Sepúlveda

Episodes

Trivia 
 Ingrid Coronado was originally going to be cast as Fran.
The song is sung by Lissete, the main star.
Fran is a fan of Juan Gabriel.
The opening credits are very similar to the original adaption, The Nanny.

See also
 List of foreign adaptations of The Nanny

Azteca 7 original programming
Mexican television sitcoms
2007 Mexican television series debuts
2007 Mexican television series endings
Mexican television series based on American television series